Larian Studios is a Belgian video game developer and publisher founded in 1996 by Swen Vincke. It focuses on developing role-playing video games and has previously worked on educational games and a number of casino games. It is best known for developing the Divinity series, and Baldur's Gate III.

Swen Vincke 
Swen Vincke founded Larian Studios in 1996. As a lead designer in the company, he contributed to all of Larian's early game projects, including the award-winning role-playing game Divine Divinity (2002) and its sequel Beyond Divinity (2004).

This virtual world has later seen licensed implementations by several other children's channels, such as the British channel CBBC (titled Adventure Rock), French channel Jeunesse TV (titled Gulliland), and Norwegian channel NRK.

Notable works
Larian's first project was called The Lady, the Mage and the Knight. During that time they also developed LED Wars, a strategy game that was developed within 5 months and published by Ionos in 1997. As a result, The Lady, the Mage and the Knight soon evolved into a collaborative project between Larian Studios and Attic Entertainment Software. Due to various problems between the two development studios and its publisher, the project was abandoned in 1999.

In 2002, Larian completed work on Divinity: Sword of Lies which was published under the name Divine Divinity by CDV. In 2004, Beyond Divinity, the sequel to Divine Divinity, was published in two editions: the standard version by Ubisoft Entertainment GmbH and the deluxe version by MediaMix Benelux which contained Divine Divinity, Beyond Divinity and a novella by Rhianna Pratchett called "Son of Chaos".

Also in 2004, KetnetKick, an educational game, was developed for Ketnet and released by Transposia. In 2006, Beyond Divinity was re-released under Gold Games 9 by Ubisoft Entertainment which was a set of 10 games on 6 DVDs.

In March 2008, Adventure Rock, an online virtual world was completed and released. This was followed by the release of KetnetKick 2 in October 2008 by VRT, the national broadcaster in Flanders. In March 2009, GulliLand was published by Jeunesse TV, a French national broadcasting channel. In January 2010, Larian released Divinity II: Ego Draconis - the sequel to Divine Divinity - to the U.S. market on Xbox 360 and Windows simultaneously, after releases in Germany, France, Spain, Italy, Poland, Russia and Benelux. Larian has also produced Divinity II: Flames of Vengeance, and built a Gold Deluxe version that holds all Divinity II episodes, called Divinity II: The Dragon Knight Saga.

In August 2013 Larian released Divinity: Dragon Commander, a game mixing strategy and role-playing elements in the Divinity universe, before the events of Divine Divinity. The game has received an overall positive reception and gained attention thanks to its novel approach to strategy.

Larian released Divinity: Original Sin, a turn-based role-playing game set between Dragon Commander and Divine Divinity, in June 2014 after several delays. The game was funded partly thanks to a Kickstarter campaign which pulled in $944,282, more than double its goal of $400,000. Original Sin was originally budgeted at €3 million, twice the amount of cash Larian had on hand, but by the time the game released Larian spent a total of €4.5 million on it; according to Swen Vincke, Larian delayed tax payments and pulled resources from Dragon Commander'''s development in order to fully fund and complete Original Sin, and the company would have gone bankrupt if the game had not been a success. Upon its release, Original Sin became the fastest-selling game in Larian's history. An enhanced edition was launched the 27 October 2015, including all formerly published downloadable content and several improvements.Divinity: Original Sin 2, a sequel to Divinity: Original Sin, was funded through Kickstarter as well, raising the necessary amount to create the game within hours, and reaching all of its stretch goals. The game takes place 1200 years after the events in Divinity: Original Sin and retains many of the gameplay elements that were present in first Original Sin. The game was released into Steam Early Access on 15 September 2016, with its full Version 1.0 release taking place just under one year later on 14 September 2017.

Larian Studios are currently developing Baldur's Gate III, which is an upcoming role-playing video game for Microsoft Windows and macOS. It is the third main game in the Baldur's Gate series, itself based on the Dungeons & Dragons tabletop role-playing system. It released in early access format across all three platforms on 6 October 2020, with a full release scheduled for August 2023.

Games developed
Divinity series
 Divine Divinity (2002)
 Beyond Divinity (2004)
 Divinity II: Ego Draconis (2009)
 Divinity II: Flames of Vengeance (2010)
 Divinity: Dragon Commander (2013)
 Divinity: Original Sin (2014)
 Divinity: Original Sin Enhanced Edition (2015)
 Divinity: Original Sin II (2017)
 Divinity: Original Sin II Definitive Edition (2018)
 Divinity: Fallen Heroes (2019) (on hold)

Licensed games
 Baldur's Gate III (2023)

Educational games
 Ketnet Kick (2004)
 Adventure Rock (2008)
 Ketnet Kick 2 (2008)
 GulliLand (2009)
 Superia (2009)

Other games
 The Lady, the Mage and the Knight (a cancelled collaboration with Attic Entertainment Software)
 LED Wars'' (1998)

References

External links

Larian Studios at MobyGames

Video game publishers
Video game companies of Belgium
Video game companies established in 1996
Belgian companies established in 1996
Video game development companies
Companies based in East Flanders
Ghent